Zigrasite is a phosphate mineral with the chemical formula of . Zigrasite was discovered and is only known to occur in the Dunton Quarry at Oxford County, Maine. Zigrasite was specifically found in the giant 1972 gem tourmaline-bearing pocket at the Dunton Quarry. Zigrasite is named after James Zigras who originally discovered and brought the mineral to attention.

Occurrence
Zigrasite is found in association with tourmaline, microcline, quartz, albite, beryl, amblygonite-montebrasite, childrenite-eosphorite, and apatite. It is crystallized as one of the last minerals during pocket formation. The crystals themselves were found perched on a crystal of tourmaline from the giant 1972 pocket at the Dunton Quarry. The quarry itself is located in a complex rare-element granitic pegmatite that has produced large quantities of gem tourmaline as well as many other rare phosphate species.

Physical Properties
Zigrasite is an offwhite to pale yellow or light tan in color. Zigrasite exhibits a vitreous luster, and a white streak. The Mohs hardness is 3.The measured( Berman Balance) and calculated densities are 2.76(4) and 2.66 g/cm3 respectively. Zigrasite exhibits imperfect cleavage in two directions, parallel to (010) and (001), it shows no parting, is brittle and has hackly fracture. In transmitted light zigrasite is colorless and non-pleochroic, biaxial negative with indices of refraction α 1.597(1) β 1.622 (1), γ 1.635 (1). Zigrasite is translucent and shows a light blue to pale yellow cathodoluminescence.

Crystal Structure 

Zigrasite's atomic coordination consists of two phosphorus sites which are solely occupied by phosphorus and tetrahedrally coordinated by four oxygen anions with <P-O> distances of 1.532 and 1.533 Å. There are also two magnesium, both of which are occupied solely by Mg and are octahedrally coordinated by two oxygen anions and four groups with <Mg-O> distances of 2.064 and 2.075 Å. There is a single zircon site solely occupied by zircon and octahedrally coordinated by six oxygen anions with a <Zr-O> distance of 2.065 Å.

The zircon octahedron shares corners with six tetrahedra to form a pinwheel cluster. This cluster forms a fragment of a  sheet which is parallel to the (001) direction. Alternating tetrahedra point up and down relative to the plane of the sheet. Isolated  octahedra are arranged in layers parallel to (001). These layers are intercalated between the  sheets linking through the apical vertices of the  tetrahedra. This structure is formally a heteropolyhedral framework with linkage weaker in the c direction accounting for cleavage.

Chemical properties 
Zigrasite is one of 3 compositional variations in zircon phosphate grains from the giant 1972 tourmaline pocket, representing the magnesium phase with malhmoodite representing the iron phase and an as of yet unnamed calcium-analogue. Zigrasite can be considered to be the magnesium end member for the zircon phosphate grains found in the giant 1972 pocket. Zigrasite exhibits hydrogen bonding which increases linkage within the layer of magnesium octahedra.

Chemical composition

X-ray crystallography 
The powder-diffraction pattern was recorded with Cu-Ka X-radiation on a DebyeScherrer camera with a diameter of114.6 mm and a Gandolfi attachment. Refinement of the unit-cell parameters gave the following values: a = 5.321(7) Å , b = 9.360(10) Å , c = 9.660(8)Å  , a = 97.38(10)º, b = 91.29(9)º, g = 90.58(9)º, V = 477.0(5) Å 3 . Unit-cell dimensions were also determined on a Bruker single-crystal diffractometer using graphite-monochromated Mo-Ka Xradiation and the resulting values (a = 5.3049(2) Å , b = 9.3372(4) Å, c = 9.6282(5) Å, a = 97.348(1)º, b = 91.534(1)º, g = 90.512(4)º) are in close agreement with those determined by powder diffraction.

See also
List of MineralsList of minerals named after people

References

External links
Dunton Quarry
James Zigras

Phosphate minerals
Zirconium minerals
Triclinic minerals
Minerals in space group 2